is a Japanese owarai duo of  as boke and  as tsukkomi, formed in 2000. The duo has won the championship title in the M-1 Grand Prix 2008 competition. The duo belongs to the management company Yoshimoto Kogyo.

Members 
 
 Born February 20, 1980 in Osaka. Plays the boke.
 
 Born March 1, 1980 in Osaka. Plays the tsukkomi.

Filmography

Anime

See also 
 Owarai
 Manzai

External links 
 Profile provided by Yoshimoto Kogyo
 Official blogs

Performing groups established in 2000
Japanese comedy duos